Bloch Park is a baseball stadium in Selma, Alabama, United States. The Selma Cloverleafs of the independent Southeastern League of Professional Baseball played here before folding prior to the 2003 season. Professional baseball was also played here in the 1940s-60s as part of the Alabama–Florida League. Then venue was also home to the summer collegiate Selma Toros from 2002 to 2005.  The team resumed play in May 2013.

The park features a small, covered grandstand that contains all bench seating and seats about 1,500. It is also used for high school and American Legion baseball.

References

External links
Photo gallery
Stadium details

Baseball venues in Alabama
Buildings and structures in Selma, Alabama
High school baseball venues in the United States
High school sports in Alabama
Minor league baseball venues